Rivadeneira, Rivadeneyra is a surname. Notable people with the surname include:

Adolfo Rivadeneyra
Gabriela Rivadeneira (born 1983), Ecuadorian politician
Oscar Rivadeneira (born 1960), Peruvian boxer
Patricia Rivadeneira
Ricardo Rivadeneira

See also
Rivadeneyra Shoal
Alfredo Rivadeneyra Hernández